Open the Iron Gate: 1973–77 is a reggae compilation album by Max Romeo, released in 1999.

The compilation consists mostly of the material from Romeo's 1975 album Revelation Time, adding four songs recorded between 1973 and 1977: "Every Man Ought to Know", "Valley of Jehosaphat", "Fire Fe the Vatican" and "Melt Away". The album was listed in the 1999 book The Rough Guide: Reggae: 100 Essential CDs. The album includes an essay by Steve Barrow in its liner notes.

Track listing
 "Every Man Ought to Know" – 3:18
 "Revelation Time/Hammer and Sickle" – 5:06
 "No Peace" – 3:43
 "Tacko" – 2:49
 "Blood of the Prophet Parts 1 & 2" – 6:24
 "Warning Warning/Version" – 7:42
 "A Quarter Pound of I'cense" – 2:43
 "Three Blind Mice" – 2:54
 "Open the Iron Gate Parts 1 & 2" – 5:14
 "Valley of Jehosaphat/Version" – 5:02
 "Fire Fe the Vatican" – 3:33
 "Melt Away" (12" Version) – 6:05

Personnel
Max Romeo – vocals
Aston Barrett – bass
Carlton "Carlie" Barrett – drums
Tony Chin – guitar
Geoffrey Chung – bass, keyboards
Glen DaCosta – tenor saxophone
Carlton "Santa" Davis – drums
Tyrone Downie – keyboards, harmonica
Bobby Ellis – flugelhorn
George Fullwood – bass
Vin Gordon – trombone
"Dirty" Harry Hall – horns
Bernard "Touter" Harvey – keyboards
Clive "Azul" Hunt – bass, percussion, keyboards
Earl Lindo – organ, clavinet
Robert Lyn – keyboards
David Madden – trumpet
Lee "Scratch" Perry – percussion
Ernest Ranglin – guitar
Earl "Chinna" Smith – guitar
Keith Sterling – piano
Uziah "Sticky" Thompson – percussion
Winston Wright – keyboards
Derrick Stewart – drums
Mike Murray – guitar, percussion

References

1999 compilation albums
Max Romeo albums
Reggae compilation albums